The social sprite (Arielulus societatis), also known as the social pipistrelle, is a species of vesper bat that is found only on the Malay Peninsula.

References

Arielulus
Mammals described in 1972
Bats of Malaysia
Endemic fauna of Malaysia
Taxonomy articles created by Polbot